Cynthia Fisher (born January 16, 1961) is an American businesswoman, entrepreneur, and corporate board director. She was a pioneer in the stem cell industry, founding the cord blood stem cell banking company, ViaCord, Inc., in 1993. In 2000, she co-founded ViaCell, which went public in 2005 (NASDAQ: VIAC) and was subsequently acquired by PerkinElmer for its ViaCord brand.

Fisher is Founder and Managing Director of WaterRev, LLC, an investment firm focused on companies with novel technologies that enable sustainable practices of water use. She serves as director and advisor to publicly held and private companies and nonprofit organizations.

Career

Fisher began her career at IBM in sales and marketing in 1983. After receiving her MBA in 1990 from Harvard Business School, she joined Haemonetics and was Marketing Manager of the Blood Bank Division. In 1993, Fisher founded ViaCord, Inc., a company that tests, types, freezes and stores the umbilical cord blood of newborns for its potential use in treating certain cancers, blood disorders, and genetic diseases. She served as CEO from ViaCord’s inception until 2000.

In 2000, Fisher co-founded and was President of ViaCell, a cellular medicines company. ViaCord then became a division of ViaCell. ViaCell went public in 2005 at a $260 million valuation. Fisher’s role in the “rearing” of ViaCell was the subject of a Harvard Business School case study. PerkinElmer acquired ViaCell in 2007 for $300 million for its ViaCord business. Fisher served on the Board of Directors of ViaCord and ViaCell. From 2002 to 2004, she was Chair of the Board of the Massachusetts Biotechnology Council.

Since 2000, Fisher has founded, advised, and invested in several privately held enterprises. She mentors entrepreneurs and is a guest lecturer at several graduate schools of business (Harvard Business School, Brandeis University, Bentley University, and Boston University).

In 2011, she founded WaterRev, LLC, an investment firm focused on companies with novel technologies that enable sustainable practices of water use.  Through 2018, Fisher was a Board Member of Water.org, the nonprofit organization founded by Gary White and Matt Damon to provide innovative, market-based solutions that change lives through safe water and sanitation.

Fisher became a Director in 2012 of The Boston Beer Company (NYSE: SAM), the maker of Samuel Adams Beer, Angry Orchard Cider, and Twisted Tea. She was the first woman on the company's board, but her appointment was criticized because she was married to Jim Koch, the company's founder.

Since 2015, Fisher has served as a Director of Easterly Government Properties (NYSE: DEA), a Real Estate Investment Trust focused on Class A commercial properties leased to U. S. Government agencies.

In 2016, Fisher co-founded FitMoney, Inc., a nonprofit organization providing K-12 curriculum for financial literacy.

In 2017, Fisher was appointed by Speaker of the House Paul Ryan to the Health Information Technology Advisory Committee.

The same year, Fisher founded PatientRightsAdvocate.org, a nonprofit organization that advocates for patients and employers to access real price transparency in healthcare, to reduce the cost of care for patients, employers, and the government.

PatientRightsAdvocate.org has created videos of both patients burdened by overwhelming costs of healthcare and employers who have successfully implemented price transparent models and saved millions for their employees and businesses.

Her commentaries advocating for price discovery have been featured in The Boston Globe, US News & World Report, Issues & Insights, and RealClearHealth.  She has been a guest on Varney & Co and CheddarTV.

In 2018, Fisher was appointed to the Board of Directors of the National Park Foundation.

Education

Fisher received an MBA from Harvard Business School. She holds a B.S. in Biophysics from Ursinus College, where she was awarded an Honorary Doctorate in Science in 2006.

Memberships

 Director, Boston Beer Company (NYSE: SAM)
 Director, Easterly Government Properties (NYSE: DEA) 
 Member of the Board of Directors, FitMoney, Inc.
 Member of the Board of Directors, National Park Foundation
 Member of the Board of Advisors, Micheli Center for Sports Injury Prevention
 Member of the Health Information Technology Advisory Committee

Personal life
Fisher is married to Jim Koch, Founder of the Boston Beer Company.

References

Living people
1961 births
American women business executives
Harvard Business School alumni
Ursinus College alumni
21st-century American women